Mansfield Township may refer to the following places:

In Canada:
 Mansfield Township, Quebec, now part of Mansfield-et-Pontefract

In the United States:
Mansfield Township, Michigan
Mansfield Township, Freeborn County, Minnesota
Mansfield Township, Burlington County, New Jersey
Mansfield Township, Warren County, New Jersey
Mansfield Township, Barnes County, North Dakota

Township name disambiguation pages